Mark Mangold is an American pop singer-songwriter, producer and keyboardist, best known as a member of the band Touch, American Tears and Drive, She Said.  As a songwriter, Mangold's songs have been performed by Michael Bolton, Cher and Jordin Sparks, Paul Rodgers, Jennifer Rush, Laura Branigan, and others.

Biography
Mangold was born in Miami and grew up on Long Island.  Mangold performed in Long Island bands Valhalla and American Tears before eventually forming Touch in 1978 along with fellow American Tears members, Glen Kithcart and Craig Brooks.

Touch charted with two Mangold-penned singles, “(Call Me) When the Spirit Moves You” in 1980 and “Don't You Know What Love Is” in 1981.

Mangold worked with Michael Bolton in the 1980s, co-writing and performing on Bolton's first hit "Fools Game" as well as several tracks from his 1985 AOR album, Everybody's Crazy.  He and Bolton would later co-write "I Found Someone", a top-ten hit for Cher, originally recorded by Laura Branigan.  Mangold himself has recorded two versions of the song. First, as a demo and again on his solo album Lift (2001).

In 1991, the band The Law recorded "For a Little Ride", a Mangold song co-written with Benny Mardones for Atlantic Records.

The Sign were formed by Mark, Randy Jackson (Zebra), Terry Brock (Strangeways), Billy Greer (Kansas) and Bobby Rondinelli (Rainbow & Black Sabbath). Their début album, released in 2000, was Signs Of Life. Their second album, The Second Coming was released in August 2005 on Frontiers Records.

Recently, Mangold has worked in Stockholm with numerous songwriters, having released "My Confession" (co-written with Jon Bivona) and "Candelight" sung by Anniela on Hitworks Records.  In Denmark, SukkerChok released his "1,000 Miles Away" which became a local hit. In 2003, Jordin Sparks recorded his song "I Will Be There", co-written with Pebe Sebert, on the For Now EP.  He has written a number of songs released in Asia, as well as 5 songs in the hit movie High Strung: Free Dance.

Mangold has written for and played keyboards in the New York City band The Radiant.
 
Other project include Ashlie Luckett, and the comedian Lauren Francesca on the "Comic Con" YouTube music video.

Discography

with American Tears
 Branded Bad (1974)
 Tear Gas (1975)
 Powerhouse (1977)
 Hard Core (2018)
 White Flags (2019)
 Free Angel Express (2020)

with Touch
 Touch (1980)
 Touch II (1982)
 Tomorrow Never Comes (2021)

with Drive, She Said
 Drive, She Said (1989)
 Drivin' Wheel (1991)
 Excelerator (1993)
 Real Life (2003)
 Pedal to the Metal (2016)

with The Sign
 Signs of Life (2000)
 The Second Coming (2004)

References

American keyboardists
American male singer-songwriters
American male pop singers
Year of birth missing (living people)
Living people
American singer-songwriters